Perrières is a commune in the Calvados department in the Normandy region in northwestern France.

History
Around 1075, the Lord of Courcy founded a priory under the protection of the Marmoutier Abbey close to Tours.

Population

See also
Communes of the Calvados department

References

Communes of Calvados (department)
Calvados communes articles needing translation from French Wikipedia